Komintern is a rural locality (a khutor) in Krasnoulskoye Rural Settlement of Maykopsky District, Russia. The population was 283 as of 2018. There are 2 streets.

Geography 
Komintern is located 29 km north of Tulsky (the district's administrative centre) by road. Krasnaya Ulka is the nearest rural locality.

References 

Rural localities in Maykopsky District